Demon Squad (also known as Night Hunters)  is a 2019 American neo-noir horror film directed by Thomas Smith.

Summary
Paranormal investigator Nick Moon from Alabama, hunting for ancient artifact, is thrust into the hidden world of supernatural beings.

Cast
Khristian Fulmer
Erin Lilley
Leah Christine Johnson
Scott Alan Warner

Legacy
It is featured as the sixth riffed film of Mystery Science Theater 3000s thirteenth season. It is the first episode hosted by original host Joel Robinson (played by series creator Joel Hodgson) since his 1993 departure.

See also
Film noir
The X-Files

References

External links
IMDb
Official trailer
Rotten Tomatoes

2019 horror films
American horror films
Films set in Alabama
2019 films
2010s rediscovered films
Rediscovered American films
2019 independent films
2010s English-language films
2010s American films